Founded in 1999 I3P, the Innovative Enterprise Incubator of the Polytechnic University of Turin (Politecnico di Torino) promotes science-based businesses in relation with university researchers or entrepreneurs.

I3P is one of the best University Business incubator and has been ranked 4th in Europe and 11th in 2013 world UBI (University Business Incubator) ranking.

In 2011 I3P launched a new incubator: Treatabit. This incubator is especially dedicated to digital businesses such as e-commerce, social web networking or web and mobile application.

Activity 
I3P provides consulting services and open spaces to entrepreneurs and introduces the companies to investors, venture capitals and a large network of entrepreneurs and managers.

Key figures 
156 start-ups launched

10–15 new start-ups per year

Owned prices

2013 
Winners of the IX edition – Start CUP Piemonte Valle D'Aosta 2013

1st: €20,000 Intoino

4th ex-equo (will take part in national Final): Scloby

2012 
Winners of the VIII edition – Start CUP Piemonte Valle D'Aosta 2013

2nd: €20,000 Natural Gentleman

ASTI prize, offeredby Comune Di Asti: Tacati

2011 
Winners of the VII edition – Start CUP Piemonte Valle D'Aosta 2012

3rd: €15,000 Safen

Hausted companies

I3P 
 Acacia Cleantech
 Acus
 Aqvatech engineering
 Bioexpansys
 BitBoss
 Biotechware
 Blue Think
 Circle Garage
 Clearbox Ai
 Ennova
 Functionable
 Geltis
 Innersee
 Intoino
 ISE-NET
 Leap
 Mediamente Consulting
 Micro Hydro Innovation
 Midori
 Miso
 Natural Gentleman
 Natural Booking
 Nesocell
 Neuron Guard
 PHI-DRIVE
 Politronica
 ProxToMe
 Resolving
 Roncolab
 Safen Fluid & Mechanical Engineering
 Scloby
 SLH
 Sportsquare games
 T4B Technology for Business
 TonicMinds
 Trampoline
  Usophy
 Wavepro
 WIICOM
 WimLambs
 Xaluxi

Treatabit 
 Actions
 Archisbang
 Bizanami
 BringMe Carpooling & Autostop
 CraCra Kids
 GeoStockPhoto
 Gnammo
 GoodMakers
 Group & Grow
 Indabox
 Intonio
 Mister Mario
 naboomboo
 Natural Booking
 Pony0Emissioni
 ProxToMe
 Regalister
 RiparAutOnline
 Scloby
 SportSquare
 Squeezol
 Tacati
 Tiny Bull Studios
 Vendi da te

Notes and references

External links 
  
 Politecnico di Torino Website 

Business incubators of Italy
Innovation organizations
1999 establishments in Italy